Borsari is a surname. Notable people with the surname include:

Nino Borsari (1911–1996), Italian cyclist
Peter Borsari (1939–2006), American-Swiss photographer
Pietro Borsari, Swiss sculptor

See also
Borsari's sign, dermatological sign
Porta Borsari, ancient Roman gate in Verona, Italy